Álvaro Antonio Gestido Pose (17 May 1907 — 18 January 1957) was a Uruguayan footballer who played as a midfielder for Uruguay national team. He played for Peñarol in club football from 1926 to 1940. He has played 26 matches for the national team, winning the 1930 FIFA World Cup and the 1928 Summer Olympics. His brother Óscar Diego Gestido was President of Uruguay in 1967.

References

1907 births
1930 FIFA World Cup players
1957 deaths
Footballers from Montevideo
Uruguayan footballers
Uruguayan Primera División players
Peñarol players
Uruguay international footballers
Olympic footballers of Uruguay
Footballers at the 1928 Summer Olympics
Olympic gold medalists for Uruguay
FIFA World Cup-winning players
Olympic medalists in football
Medalists at the 1928 Summer Olympics
Association football midfielders
20th-century Uruguayan people